The Bachelor of Science in Respiratory Care (BSRC or BScRC) is a four-year academic degree in the science and principles of respiratory care, granted by a tertiary education university or similarly accredited school. 

In the United States one is eligible to sit for the NBRC-WRE licensing examination to become a Registered Respiratory Therapist after graduating from either a two-year program with an associate degree or from a four-year program with a bachelor's degree, the bachelor's degree prepares respiratory practitioners for a professional role away from the bedside with coursework in science, research, leadership, and informatics.

Respiratory care practice
Students awarded a Bachelor of Science in Respiratory Care are qualified to sit for the three credentialing examinations NBRC-ELE, NBRC-WRE, and NBRC-CSE and apply for licensure as a Registered Respiratory Therapist.

See also
 Respiratory Care

References

External links
Hyperbaric Oxygen Therapy


Pulmonology
Science in Respiratory Care
Respiratory therapy
Respiratory Care